Rafael Arias-Salgado  (26 January 1942, Madrid) is a Spanish politician.

The son of Gabriel Arias-Salgado, a minister under Franco and brother of Fernando Arias-Salgado : a former head of the Spanish TV company and a diplomat.

He qualified as a lawyer, was a deputy for the UCD for Toledo from 1977–1982, serving as Minister of relationships within the Cortes (1979–1980), Minister to the President of the Cortes (1980–1981) and minister of territorial administration (1981–1982).

After the disbandment of the UCD he dedicated himself to private business. He was president of the security company Prosegur (1983–1985). In 1987 he joined the UCD splinter party the Democratic and Social Centre (CDS) and represented that party as deputy for Madrid (1990–1992). In 1993 he joined the Partido Popular, serving as Minister of Public Works (1996–2000).

Currently he is President of the Carrefour group in Spain.

References

1942 births
Living people
Members of the constituent Congress of Deputies (Spain)
Members of the 1st Congress of Deputies (Spain)
Members of the 4th Congress of Deputies (Spain)
Members of the 5th Congress of Deputies (Spain)
Members of the 6th Congress of Deputies (Spain)
Members of the 7th Congress of Deputies (Spain)
People's Party (Spain) politicians
Politicians from Madrid
Government ministers of Spain
Democratic and Social Centre (Spain) politicians
Union of the Democratic Centre (Spain) politicians